Ephesus Museum may refer to:

Ephesos Museum in Vienna
 Ephesus Archaeological Museum in Selçuk near Ephesus